Found Brothers Aviation was a Canadian aircraft manufacturer from its formation in 1948 to its closure in 1968. The company was succeeded by Found Aircraft.

History 
The company was formed at Malton, Ontario in 1948 to produce the Found FBA-1, a four-seat cabin monoplane designed by Captain S.R. Found. The aircraft was developed into an all-metal version, the FBA-2C. The aircraft entered production and 34 were built. A further improved version the Centennial was developed, this had just gained type certification in July 1968 when the company went out of business.

Aircraft designs 

 1949 - Found FBA-1
 1960 - Found FBA-2
 1967 - Found Centennial

References 

Notes

Bibliography

 The Illustrated Encyclopedia of Aircraft (Part Work 1982-1985). London: Orbis Publishing.

Aviation history of Canada
Defunct aircraft manufacturers of Canada
Defunct manufacturing companies of Canada
History of manufacturing in Ontario